Claire Bové (born 3 June 1998) is a French rower. She competed in the women's lightweight double sculls event at the 2020 Summer Olympics.

References

External links
 

1998 births
Living people
French female rowers
Olympic rowers of France
Rowers at the 2020 Summer Olympics
Sportspeople from Yvelines
Medalists at the 2020 Summer Olympics
Olympic medalists in rowing
Olympic silver medalists for France
21st-century French women